The Killers are an American rock band formed in Las Vegas in 2001 by Brandon Flowers (lead vocals, keyboards, bass) and Dave Keuning (lead guitar, backing vocals). After going through a number of short-term bass players and drummers in their early days, both Mark Stoermer (bass, rhythm guitar, backing vocals) and Ronnie Vannucci Jr. (drums, percussion) joined the band in 2002. The band's name is derived from a logo on the bass drum of a fictitious band portrayed in the music video for the New Order song "Crystal".

The Killers have released seven studio albums, each of which reached the top spot on the UK Albums Chart: Hot Fuss (2004), Sam's Town (2006), Day & Age (2008), Battle Born (2012), Wonderful Wonderful (2017), Imploding the Mirage (2020), and Pressure Machine (2021). They have also released a B-sides and rarities compilation, Sawdust (2007); a live album, Live from the Royal Albert Hall (2009); a greatest-hits album, Direct Hits (2013); and a Christmas compilation, Don't Waste Your Wishes (2016).

Since 2016 and 2017 respectively, both Stoermer and Keuning have had extended periods of hiatus from the band, though both remain official members. Stoermer mostly retired from touring, citing both exhaustion from the road and lingering effects from a pyrotechnics accident, while Keuning has released a solo album. Despite his hiatus from touring, Stoermer has participated in recording sessions for Wonderful Wonderful and Imploding the Mirage, and it was announced that Keuning was participating in recording Pressure Machine, which was released on August 13, 2021. Ted Sablay, who had served as a touring keyboardist and rhythm guitarist for the band since 2006, assumed lead guitar duties for live shows in Keuning's absence, while touring rhythm guitarist and keyboardist Jake Blanton took up the job of bassist and has taken Stoermer's place in live shows. With Sablay moving to lead guitar, the band hired Taylor Milne and Robbie Connolly to play rhythm guitar and keyboards live.

The Killers are considered one of the biggest rock bands of the 21st century, selling more than 28 million records worldwide, including 10.8 million in the US alone. They have performed in over 50 countries and on six continents, headlining venues such as Madison Square Garden, Wembley Stadium and Glastonbury Festival (2007 and 2019).

History

2001–2003: Origins and formation
In 2001, Brandon Flowers was fired by his first band, a Utah synth-pop trio known as Blush Response. After attending an Oasis concert at the Hard Rock Hotel during The Tour of Brotherly Love, Flowers realized his calling was to be in a rock band and began searching for like-minded musicians. He eventually came across an ad posted in a Las Vegas newspaper by Dave Keuning, a 25-year-old guitarist who had moved to Vegas from Iowa a year earlier. When the pair met, they bonded over similar musical influences and immediately began writing songs together in Keuning's apartment. They named their band the Killers as that was the name of a fictional band in the music video for the New Order song "Crystal". In November 2001, they headed to Kill the Messenger Studio in Henderson, Nevada, along with recently recruited drummer Matt Norcross to begin recording a demo; they recorded two tracks: "Mr. Brightside", which was the first song Flowers and Keuning wrote together, and "Desperate". A month later, they recorded two more, "Under the Gun" and "Replaceable", with Keuning's roommate Dell Neal on bass.

Keuning and Flowers played their first live show together at an open mic night at the Cafe Espresso Roma in Las Vegas in January 2002; the pair, joined by Neal and Norcross, began playing venues around the city where they would also hand out free copies of their demo. The Killers brought a unique style to the small Vegas music scene which was predominately filled with punk, nu metal, and rap bands; one local reviewer stated, "The Killers, thankfully, don't come across like any other band in town", and described their sound as a mix between the "pop styles of British music and the lo-fi fuzz of modern indie rock". However, the Killers, whose early live sound was also described as erratic, had, by the summer of 2002, fired drummer Matt Norcross and replaced him briefly with Brian Havens, who was also eventually fired. Bassist Dell Neal later left the band due to personal reasons.

Ronnie Vannucci Jr. joined the Killers shortly before Neal's departure. Vannucci was well known on the Las Vegas music scene, having played in numerous bands since he was young. It was while he was drumming for other bands including Daphne Major and Romance Fantasy in 2002 that he had met the Killers. Ronnie's first show with the band was on August 30, 2002, at a club called The Junkyard. Playing bass for the Killers that night was Mark Stoermer, who was at this point the lead guitarist for local progressive rock band the Negative Ponies. The band were keen on Stoermer joining them on a permanent basis, but he was initially reluctant to commit. They had first approached him to be the second guitarist when they were considering turning the band into a five-piece, "possibly more like the Strokes, with a keyboard". Stoermer mentioned later on that he could also play bass. The band had continued as a three-piece trying out other bassists until November 2002, when Stoermer eventually accepted the invitation to join. According to Ryan Pardey, who booked many of the band's early shows, "They (the Killers) became a great band when Ronnie and Mark joined. That’s when they finally became a cohesive unit. What Ronnie did — he was the discipline — and Mark was just a solid musician."

While walking through a Virgin Megastore in Las Vegas in 2002, Flowers noticed the album artwork on the then-new Elvis Presley compilation album ELV1S: 30 No. 1 Hits. This gave him the inspiration to use a marquee sign motif as the band's logo. The band hired Vannucci's roommate's girlfriend to design it, and the logo has been used in the band's branding, releases, promotional materials, and merchandise ever since.

The four members would get together in Vannucci's garage to work on song ideas. They would also sneak into the band room at the University of Nevada, Las Vegas (where Vannucci was studying classical percussion) at night to practice. It was during this period that the band wrote much of their debut album Hot Fuss including hit singles "Somebody Told Me" and "Smile Like You Mean It". The band continued playing at small venues around their hometown, often playing Sunday nights at a transgender bar named Sasha's (later renamed Tramps). It wasn't long before they caught the attention of Braden Merrick, an A&R rep for Warner Bros. Records who had come across their demo on a website dedicated to unsigned bands in the Las Vegas area; after attending a live show he offered to help the band find a record deal and eventually became their manager. He took the band to the San Francisco area, to Berkeley, California, to record demos with former Green Day manager Jeff Saltzman, they then sent the demo tapes out to major record labels in the US. The band was invited to perform at a number of showcases but were ultimately not signed, the band however did catch the eye of Alex Gilbert, who was an A&R rep from the United Kingdom. Gilbert took a demo with him back to the UK and showed it to his friend Ben Durling, who worked at the newly formed Independent label Lizard King Records in London. Despite not yet meeting the band in person, Lizard King were quick to offer the band a deal based on the strength of the five song demo. The Killers signed with the British label in July 2003.

2003–2005: Hot Fuss
On August 19, 2003, the song "Mr. Brightside" premiered on DJ Zane Lowe's BBC Radio 1 show in the UK. The Killers traveled to London the following month to spend a week playing at influential live music venues across the city. On September 29, 2003, the song "Mr. Brightside" was released in the UK on a limited number of CDs and vinyl records. Critical reviews of both the song and the shows were positive: NME noted the band's retro sound, commenting "The Killers steal so smartly, and with such mind-boggling variety". As a result of the buzz generated in the UK, a number of major labels in the US began showing strong interest in the band and they were invited to play at the ASCAP CMJ Music Marathon in New York City. They eventually signed with the record label Island Def Jam.

The band finished recording Hot Fuss in November 2003 with Jeff Saltzman. They decided to keep many of the previously recorded demos as they felt they had a spontaneity that re-recordings would not have. Shortly afterwards they returned to London having been invited to support British Sea Power on their UK tour, the band also worked with Alan Moulder at Eden Studios and Townhouse Studios mixing tracks for their upcoming album. They continued playing support slots during the first half of 2004 most notably touring both the US & UK with Stellastarr and opening for Morrissey on two occasions. The band filmed their first music video for the Spring 2004 release of "Somebody Told Me" which was to be the band's debut single in the US and second single in the UK. The band's first headline tour started in the UK in May 2004. During the spring and summer of 2004, the group played well-received sets at festivals across Europe and North America which helped add to their growing fanbase.

The Killers released their debut album Hot Fuss on June 7, 2004, in the United Kingdom on Lizard King Records and a week later in the United States on Island Records. The track listing differed depending on territory, in the UK and Australia "Glamorous Indie Rock and Roll" replaces "Change Your Mind" as track eight. Upon release Hot Fuss received generally favorable reviews from critics. Extensive touring and the success of the Grammy Award nominated singles "Somebody Told Me", "All These Things That I've Done" and "Mr. Brightside" led to the album becoming a huge commercial success. Hot Fuss reached number one in the UK in January 2005, seven months after its release, and has been certified 7× Platinum in both the UK and Ireland. It went on to spend more weeks on the UK Albums chart than any other album that decade, 173 weeks in total. In the US, the album reached its peak position of number seven in April 2005 and has been certified 3× Platinum. It reached the top spot in Australia in March 2005, where it was certified 3× Platinum. It has also been certified 3× Platinum in Canada, Platinum in New Zealand and Gold in Argentina, Belgium, Germany and France. "Mr. Brightside" would eventually be downloaded 3.7 million times in the United States .

The Killers were named the World's Best Selling New Group at the 2005 World Music Awards, the same year they won the MTV Video Music Award for Best New Artist and were also nominated for three Grammy Awards with Hot Fuss being nominated for Best Rock Album. In the UK, they picked up an NME Award for Best International Band. The band was recognized by Rolling Stone as the "best-selling new rock band of the past year" in June 2005. Lead singer Brandon Flowers had also gained media attention, being named both Sexiest and Best Dressed Man at the NME Awards, he had also caused controversy due to some outspoken views on other bands.

In July 2005, the Killers performed on the London stage of the Live 8 concert, playing "All These Things That I've Done". Robbie Williams incorporated the song's refrain "I've got soul but I'm not a soldier" into his own performance. Coldplay and U2 followed suit and, at their separate concerts played in Las Vegas, with the Killers in the crowd, incorporated the line into their songs "God Put a Smile Upon Your Face" and "Beautiful Day", respectively.

The band fired manager Braden Merrick in 2006. Merrick later filed a lawsuit against the band for breach of contract and their new manager and lawyer, Robert Reynolds, for $16 million each. The band counter sued, citing that Merrick's poor management had cost them millions. The case was settled in 2009.

2006–2007: Sam's Town and Sawdust
Shortly after finishing touring for Hot Fuss, the Killers headed back into the studio to start recording their highly anticipated second studio album with producers Alan Moulder and Flood, who were working together for the first time in a decade. Sam's Town was mostly recorded at Studio at the Palms in Las Vegas, with finishing touches added to the album at Criterion Studios, London in June 2006. Upon completion of the album, Flowers claimed he felt the band had made "one of the best albums of the past twenty years" and that he wanted the album to capture "everything important that got me to where I am today". In July 2006, the lead single "When You Were Young" was premiered and it became a hit, gaining another two Grammy Award nominations and mostly positive reviews with many bringing attention to the influence of heartland rock on the song.

The Killers' second album, Sam's Town, was released in October 2006 under Island Def Jam Music Group. It received a varied response with some critics praising the album and the evolution of the band and others criticizing and mocking it, most notably it received a scathing review from Rolling Stone. The album sold over 706,000 copies worldwide in the first week of release, reaching number two on the US Billboard chart and number one on the UK chart. The album has since been certified 5× Platinum in the United Kingdom; 4× Platinum in Ireland; 2× Platinum in Australia, Canada, and New Zealand; Platinum in the United States and Gold in Argentina, Belgium, Germany, and Russia.

The Killers recorded a live session at Abbey Road Studios for Live from Abbey Road on November 29, 2006. They performed an almost totally unplugged set, which included stripped back versions of the album's title track "Sam's Town", "When You Were Young" and a rendition of the Dire Straits hit "Romeo and Juliet". In December 2006, the band released a Christmas charity song, "A Great Big Sled", which benefited Product Red. This has since become an annual tradition. 

In February 2007, the Killers attended the BRIT Awards in the United Kingdom, where they performed "When You Were Young". The band won two awards — Best International Group & International Album. In the same month, the band's Tim Burton-directed video for the album's second single, "Bones", won Best Video at the NME Awards.

The band recorded the video for the album's third single "Read My Mind" in Tokyo, Japan during a break in their Sam's Town Tour. The single release was accompanied by a remix of the song by the Pet Shop Boys. Due to high ticket demand, the Killers began headlining arenas including Madison Square Garden for the first time and also headlined a number of major European festivals during 2007, including Glastonbury Festival.

, the Killers have sold 5.3 million copies of both Hot Fuss and Sam's Town.

The band released a compilation album called Sawdust, containing B-sides from the band's first two albums, rarities, and unreleased material in November 2007. Sawdust has been classified Platinum in the UK. The album's first single "Tranquilize", a collaboration with Lou Reed, was released in October 2007. The album also featured a cover of "Shadowplay" by Joy Division which was recorded for the soundtrack to the Anton Corbijn directed biopic Control.

2007–2011: Day & Age and hiatus

The band enlisted Stuart Price to produce their third studio album, he had previously remixed their songs under his Jacques Lu Cont moniker, the most notable being the remix of "Mr. Brightside". They first met Price at his London home in 2007 to discuss the possibility of him producing some unreleased tracks for their b-sides album Sawdust, however that same night they ended up in Price's home studio recording a demo of "Human" a new song that would become the eventual lead single from Day & Age. The band took six months apart following the completion of their Sam's Town tour, during this period they would send song ideas between each other and Price via Logic Pro. The band finished recording the album with Price at the band's newly acquired Battle Born Studios in Las Vegas.

"Human" was released in October 2008 with Flowers describing the song as "Johnny Cash meets the Pet Shop Boys". The song went on to become a huge hit worldwide, the lyric "Are we human, or are we dancer?" created much confusion and debate due to its grammar and ambiguity, with some believing the lyric was "dancers" or "denser" rather than "dancer", Flowers explained that the line was inspired by a Hunter S. Thompson quote where he stated America was raising "a generation of dancers". It has since been voted by one poll as the most confusing song lyric of all time.

The Killers' third album, Day & Age, was released on November 18, 2008. Flowers stated that Day & Age was "like looking at Sam's Town from Mars", the band have called it their "most playful record" with the album making use of saxophones, steel drums, harpsichord, and tribal chanting. The album also saw the band write some of their most personal and challenging lyrics to date, closing track "Goodnight, Travel Well" was written about the death of Keuning's mother. While "A Dustland Fairytale" was written as a tribute to frontman Flowers' parents, his mother had recently been diagnosed with terminal cancer. Day & Age became the band's third studio album to reach number one in both the UK and Ireland, it reached number six on the Billboard 200 album chart. It has also been certified 4× Platinum in the UK and Ireland, Platinum in Germany, Australia, New Zealand and Canada and Gold in the US, Mexico, Sweden, Norway, Austria, Switzerland, Greece and the Middle East.

The band embarked on the Day & Age World Tour, during which they performed on every continent and headlined US festivals Lollapalooza and Coachella for the first time. The tour was named one of the top 50 worldwide concert tours of 2009. On July 5–6, 2009 at the Royal Albert Hall, London the Killers recorded their first live DVD, Live from the Royal Albert Hall. It was released in November and played at various cinemas across the globe. Live from the Royal Albert Hall was certified 2× Platinum in the UK, Platinum in the US and Australia and Gold in Ireland and Brazil.

In January 2010, the band announced that they would take a short break after being on the road for the better part of six years. The break lasted for about a year and a half, during which band members devoted themselves on solo projects, while the band made sporadic other contributions. In late February 2010, Flowers' mother died after a two-year fight with brain cancer. This resulted in the cancellation of dates in Asia. Two Australian dates in Sydney and Perth were also cancelled; however, both the Gold Coast and Melbourne concerts went ahead, with the Day & Age tour finally coming to a close in Melbourne on February 21 when the Killers were the headline act of the Good Vibrations Festival at Flemington Racecourse.

2011–2013: Return and Battle Born
The band returned to the stage in 2011 when they headlined the new International Lollapalooza Festival in Santiago, Chile on April 2, 2011. They also performed at the season closing Top of the Mountain concert in Ischgl, Austria on April 30, 2011. They headlined Hard Rock Calling for the second time in Hyde Park, London on June 24, 2011. The Killers were also the inaugural headliner of the new Orlando Calling Festival in Orlando, Florida on November 12, 2011.

The band headed back into the studio to record their fourth studio album in 2011, during the recording they worked with five producers Steve Lillywhite, Damian Taylor, Brendan O'Brien, Stuart Price and Daniel Lanois. In June 2012, a short trailer was released on the Killers official VEVO page, revealing the album's name Battle Born, named after the flag of Nevada. This was followed by the release of lead single "Runaways" in July. That same month, they headlined Saturday night at the inaugural Firefly Music Festival in Dover, Delaware.

The Killers' fourth studio album Battle Born was released on September 18, 2012. The album became the Killers' fourth consecutive No. 1 album in the UK and Ireland and has been certified Platinum in the UK and Gold in Ireland, Mexico and Australia. The band's Battle Born World Tour proved their most widespread yet with the band visiting new territories including Russia and China. The tour was named the 43rd highest grossing worldwide during 2013. On June 22, 2013, the band played their biggest show to date at the 90,000 capacity Wembley Stadium; the band performed a song specifically written for the occasion. Reviews of the show were extremely positive. The band once again headlined festivals across Europe, Australia, South America & North America. In October 2013 the Killers headlined the inaugural Life Is Beautiful Festival in hometown Las Vegas, concluding their Battle Born World Tour.

2013–2016: Direct Hits
On September 11, 2013, the band tweeted a picture, which contained six lines of Morse code. The code was translated to "The Killers Shot at the Night". On September 16, 2013, exactly ten years to the day of their first show in London, the Killers released "Shot at the Night" which was produced by Anthony Gonzalez. It was also revealed that they would be releasing their first greatest hits compilation, Direct Hits released on November 11, 2013. The album featured songs from all four studio albums, the new single "Shot at the Night" and another new song "Just Another Girl". The release of Direct Hits was followed by a short promotional tour, the band also played a number of festivals in 2014.

The band headlined the opening night of the new T-Mobile Arena on the Las Vegas strip on April 6, 2016, the band were joined during their set by a number of guests including "Mr. Las Vegas" Wayne Newton and the Blue Man Group. On May 24, 2016, the band announced that Mark Stoermer was taking a break from touring "to pursue other educational goals and releasing a solo album". The statement emphasized that Stoermer was still involved in working on the band's fifth album and will still occasionally perform live with them in the future. In Stoermer's absence touring keyboardist/guitarist Jake Blanton moved to bass guitar. On September 30 and October 1, 2016, the band (including Stoermer) celebrated the tenth anniversary of their second album, Sam's Town, by playing two nights at the Sam's Town Hotel and Gambling Hall, which the album was named after. For these shows, they played the album in full from start to finish. The band contributed a track titled "Mixed Signals" to Robbie Williams' eleventh studio album, The Heavy Entertainment Show, released in November 2016.

2017–2018: Wonderful Wonderful 

The Killers released their fifth studio album, Wonderful Wonderful, on September 22, 2017. The album was produced by Jacknife Lee and lead single "The Man" was released on June 14, 2017.
 Before the album's release the band headed to Europe for a number of summer festival dates, including a secret set at Glastonbury Festival, where Stoermer joined them to perform on the John Peel Stage, the same stage they had performed on during their first appearance at the festival 13 years earlier. The run of shows concluded with a sold-out headline performance at the British Summer Time festival in London's Hyde Park.

On August 6, 2017, it was announced that Dave Keuning was going on an indefinite hiatus from the band, citing exhaustion from a grueling tour schedule and a desire to spend more time with his son.

The Killers released a statement on August 28, 2017, confirming that neither Stoermer nor Keuning would participate in the band's upcoming Wonderful Wonderful World Tour, while reiterating that both are still members of the band. Jake Blanton would continue to fill in for Stoermer while touring guitarist/keyboardist Ted Sablay would fill in for Keuning. The band added another two touring musicians: keyboardist/rhythm guitarist Robbie Connolly and rhythm/lead guitarist Taylor Milne, a member of Big Talk, Vannucci's project.

The band headlined the 2017 AFL Grand Final in Melbourne, Australia on September 30, 2017. Following the conclusion of the game, the band also headlined a free concert at the Melbourne Cricket Ground (MCG) and earned praise for their performance. They also welcomed onstage Jack Riewoldt, a fan and a vice-captain of the Richmond side that had been victorious against Adelaide in the Grand Final, to perform "Mr. Brightside" with them.

Wonderful Wonderful became the band's first album to reach the number one spot on the US Billboard 200; it also claimed the top spot on the UK Album Chart, making the Killers the first international act to have their first five studio albums reach number one in the UK.

In May 2018, Flowers told the Irish Independent that he wanted to make another album with the band. In October 2018, guitarist Dave Keuning told NME that the band was in the early stages of the next album, though he wasn't sure how big a role he would have in its creation process.

On January 14, 2019, the band released the standalone track, "Land of the Free", the official music video for which was directed by Spike Lee. It was announced that the Killers would be performing at Woodstock 50, though Woodstock 50 was canceled after a series of permit and production issues, venue relocations, and artist cancellations.

2019–2020: Imploding the Mirage 
On November 15, 2019, the Killers announced their 6th studio album titled Imploding the Mirage for a Spring 2020 release. On that day, the band also announced a UK and Ireland stadium tour to take place in May and June 2020. On March 12, 2020, the album's lead single "Caution" was released featuring a solo by Lindsey Buckingham. Lindsey Buckingham said of the band, "There’s such a strong center to what they're doing. Their material is so well crafted that it cuts across a lot of generational lines." It was also confirmed by Flowers that Keuning did not participate in recording the album and that he will still not be touring with the band. On April 25, 2020, "Caution" reached number one on Billboards Alternative Songs chart, setting a record of 13 years and 6 months since the band's last number-one song on the chart.

In an interview with Rolling Stone published on May 5, 2020, Flowers and Vannucci stated that while Keuning is on hiatus from the band and that they had difficulties in working on the new album without him, he is still welcome to return to the Killers. They also stated that although Stoermer's role in the band continues to be limited due to pyro-inflicted hearing damage suffered during a past show in London, he is still close with Flowers and Vannucci, was involved in the recording of the album, and is expected to play select live shows once touring resumes. On July 15, 2020, the band released the music video of their new album second single "My Own Soul's Warning" and stated the album would be released on August 21, 2020.

2020–2021: Pressure Machine and Keuning's return 
On the weekend of Imploding the Mirages release, Flowers revealed that the band was currently in the studio working on their seventh studio album: "You know when someone makes a record and they say that they have fifty songs and they’re going to release another record? Well, we really are! We’re going to release another one in about ten months. We’ve already gone back into the studio with [producers Jonathan] Rado and Shawn [Everett]. I’m excited. It might be better than [Imploding the Mirage]." The band revealed in 22 December a provisional "A-List" of "apparent song titles on social media, sparking speculation that another new album could be on the way". In January 2021, Dave Keuning reunited with the band in the studio and are preparing to release their 7th studio album. Keuning also said that he and Mark Stoermer are open to playing live with the band. During a podcast interview in June, Vannucci revealed that the album would be released in August.

Earlier in 2021, the band moved performance rights management from ASCAP to Irving Azoff-owned performance rights organization Global Music Rights.

On June 10, 2021 Bruce Springsteen announced an upcoming collaboration with the Killers. Later that day the Killers' social media announced the remake of "A Dustland Fairytale" retitled "Dustland" after a series of teases by the band throughout the day.

As it was announced on July 19, 2021, the band's seventh album, entitled Pressure Machine, was released on August 13, 2021. Mark Stoermer remained absent due to difficulties presented by the COVID-19 Pandemic during recording and did not make it to the studio. The Forty-Five's Rhian Daly called it a "quiet, poetic character study of small-town life." Pressure Machine debuted at No. 1. on the  Official U.K. Albums Chart, snagging the band's seventh U.K. No. 1.

 2021–present: Upcoming eighth album
In June 2021, Keuning confirmed that the band had begun working on their eighth album, for which Flowers alluded to an early 2023 release in July 2022.

In March 2022, the band released a deluxe edition of Pressure Machine. The next month they kicked off their Imploding the Mirage tour with three nights at the Chelsea Ballroom in the Cosmopolitan of Las Vegas. Bassist Mark Stoermer was still absent, his part covered on tour by Jake Blanton, but Stoermer was reportedly interested in recording the band's next album, their eighth.

On July 8, 2022, the band unveiled their upcoming single "Boy" during their performance at Mad Cool Festival in Madrid. The song was written during the Pressure Machine recording sessions but didn't fit the album's aesthetic. During an interview with NME Flowers confirmed they have been working on their eighth album, stating there would be more single releases in 2022 leading to the album's release early 2023.

Musical style and influences

The Killers have been grouped with various genres, including alternative rock, indie rock, post-punk revival, new wave, heartland rock, pop rock, synth-pop, pop, glam rock, dance-rock, dance-pop, arena rock, and electronic rock.

Keuning's original newspaper ad sought to assemble a band influenced by Oasis, the Smashing Pumpkins, David Bowie and Radiohead. Band members have also cited influences including Bruce Springsteen, U2, the Cure, the Cars and the Smiths, along with the electronic bands Duran Duran, Depeche Mode, Pet Shop Boys, New Order and Orchestral Manoeuvres in the Dark (OMD).

Solo projects
 Brandon Flowers has released two solo albums: Flamingo (2010) and The Desired Effect (2015).
 Mark Stoermer has released three solo albums: Another Life (2011), Dark Arts (2016) and Filthy Apes and Lions (2017).
 Ronnie Vannucci Jr.'s side project, Big Talk, has released two albums: Big Talk (2011) and Straight In No Kissin' (2015).
 Dave Keuning has released two solo albums: Prismism (2019) and A Mild Case of Everything (2021).

Activism and philanthropy

Political relations
Invited by U.S. President Barack Obama, the band played on the White House South Lawn on July 4, 2010, for the second annual "Salute to the Military" United Service Organizations concert as part of Independence Day celebrations, which Flowers described as a "monumental honor". Despite their hiatus, the band got together to play "Human", "Somebody Told Me", "Mr. Brightside", "A Dustland Fairytale", "God Bless America/Read My Mind" and "When You Were Young". Flowers, Keuning and Stoermer also played at a campaign rally on July 8, 2010, in Nevada for Obama and U.S. Senate Majority Leader Harry Reid who was up for re-election. The Killers played an acoustic version of "Read My Mind" and did a folksy rendition of the state song, "Home Means Nevada". In February 2011, Flowers had a private lunch with Mitt Romney during Romney's visit to the Republican Party convention in Nevada. In 2012, the band remained neutral in the election. In 2015, Flowers performed a folksy rendition of the state song, "Home Means Nevada" for Obama and U.S. Senate Minority Leader Harry Reid at the National Clean Energy Summit. In 2017 the band wrote a letter opposing development on the Red Rock Canyon National Conservation Area. "Land of the Free" references a number of political issues, including immigration, gun control, and police killings of African Americans.

Annual Christmas singles and Don't Waste Your Wishes
Beginning in 2006, the Killers released annual Christmas themed singles and videos in aid of the charity Product Red, supporting The Global Fund to Fight AIDS, Tuberculosis and Malaria. The band released ten Christmas themed songs and music videos as singles: "A Great Big Sled" (2006), "Don't Shoot Me Santa" (2007), "Joseph, Better You than Me" (2008), "Happy Birthday Guadalupe!" (2009), "Boots" (2010), "The Cowboys' Christmas Ball" (2011), "I Feel It in My Bones" (2012), "Christmas In LA" (2013), "Joel the Lump of Coal" (2014), and "Dirt Sledding" (2015). On November 30, 2011, they released the (RED) Christmas EP on iTunes which features all six songs that had been released up to that point. Over the years they have enlisted the help of other musicians and celebrities including Elton John, Neil Tennant (Pet Shop Boys), Toni Halliday (Curve), Wild Light, Mariachi El Bronx, Dawes, Owen Wilson, Jimmy Kimmel & Richard Dreyfuss. In 2016 they announced that they would be releasing no more Christmas singles but that they hoped another band would carry on the tradition, to wrap things up they released a compilation album Don't Waste Your Wishes featuring all ten previous singles plus a cover of the holiday classic "I'll Be Home For Christmas" which featured vocals from Brandon Flowers' former elementary school teacher and Korean War veteran Ned Humphrey Hansen. All proceeds from the songs and the compilation album have been and will be donated to Product Red campaign and the fight against AIDS in Africa and  they have raised over $1 million for the charity.

Additional contributions
The Killers song "Goodnight, Travel Well" was used in an effort to promote awareness for sex trafficking headed by UNICEF, MTV EXIT (End Exploitation And Trafficking), and the US Agency for International Development. "Hotel California" was covered by the Killers and Rhythms del Mundo with proceeds benefiting climate crisis and natural disaster relief. The U2 song "Ultraviolet (Light My Way)" was covered by the Killers with proceeds benefiting famine-stricken areas. The band headlined the 2017 Global Citizen Festival.

Band members

 Official members Current members Brandon Flowers – lead vocals, keyboards, synthesizer (2001–present), bass (2001–2002, 2006)
 Dave Keuning – guitars, backing vocals (2001–2017, 2020–present)
 Ronnie Vannucci Jr. – drums, percussion (2002–present), guitars (2020–2022)
 Mark Stoermer – bass, backing vocals (2002–2020, 2022–present), guitar (2006, 2017–2020)Former members Matt Norcross – drums (2001–2002)
 Brian Havens – drums (2002)
 Dell Neal – bass, backing vocals (2001–2002)Official members timeline Touring musicians Current touring musicians Ted Sablay – lead guitar (2017–2020, 2022–present), rhythm guitar, keyboards (2006–2007, 2011–2017, 2020–2022), backing vocals (2006–2007, 2011–present)
 Jake Blanton – bass (2013, 2016–present), keyboards, rhythm guitar (2011–2016), backing vocals (2011–present)
 Amanda Brown – backing vocals (2017–present)
 Erica Canales – backing vocals (2017–present)
 Danielle Withers – backing vocals, violin, acoustic guitar (2017–present)
 Robbie Connolly – keyboards, rhythm guitar, backing vocals (2017–present)
 Taylor Milne – rhythm guitar, keyboards, backing vocals (2017–2020, 2022–present)Former touring musicians Rob Whited – percussion, backing vocals (2006–2014)
 Bobby Lee Parker – acoustic guitar (2008–2014)
 Ray Suen – keyboards, violin, rhythm guitar, backing vocals (2008–2010)
 Tommy Marth – saxophone, backing vocals (2008–2010, died 2012)
 Brian Karscig – rhythm guitar, keyboards, backing vocals (2016)

 Touring musicians timeline'''

Discography

Studio albums
 Hot Fuss (2004)
 Sam's Town (2006)
 Day & Age (2008)
 Battle Born (2012)
 Wonderful Wonderful (2017)
 Imploding the Mirage (2020)
 Pressure Machine (2021)

Awards and nominations

The Killers have been nominated for seven Grammy Awards, seven BRIT Awards, and twenty-four NME Awards.

The Killers have won four NME Awards for "Best International Band," in 2005, 2008, 2009, and 2013. The band has won a BRIT Award for "Best International Band" in 2007 as well as a MTV Europe Music Award for "Best Rock Group" in 2006. Also in 2006, the band won for "Best Video" for "When You Were Young" at the Q Awards. To date, the band has received six nominations for "Best International Band" at the NME Awards, four nominations for "Best International Group" at the BRIT Awards, and three nominations for "Best Rock Group" at the MTV Europe Music Awards.

Sales accolades
 The Killers are the only international act to have a seven-album streak of No. 1 albums, from their debut, on the UK Albums Chart (Brandon Flowers has another two No. 1 solo albums).
 Single "Mr. Brightside" is the longest-charting single on the UK Singles Chart of all time (300 weeks) and the most-streamed track released prior to 2010 in the UK.
 Hot Fuss charted in the year-end UK Albums Chart each year from 2004 to 2009 and ranks among the top 20 longest-charting albums on the UK Albums Chart.
 Sam's Town'' charted in the year-end UK Albums Chart each year from 2006 to 2009 and has spent more than two years on the UK Albums Chart.

Additional honors
 University of Nevada, Las Vegas College of Fine Arts Hall of Fame Inductee (2008)
 ASCAP Vanguard Award Recipient (2010)

See also
 List of artists who have spent the most weeks on the UK music charts
 List of songs which have spent the most weeks on the UK Singles Chart
 List of albums which have spent the most weeks on the UK Albums Chart
 List of UK Albums Chart number ones of the 2000s
 List of UK Albums Chart number ones of the 2010s
 List of UK Albums Chart number ones of the 2020s
 List of Billboard 200 number-one albums
 Battle Born Studios

Notes

References

External links

 

2001 establishments in Nevada
Alternative rock groups from Nevada
Brit Award winners
Island Records artists
 
Mercury Records artists
MTV Europe Music Award winners
Musical groups established in 2001
Musical groups from Las Vegas
Musical quartets
NME Awards winners
Post-punk revival music groups
Vertigo Records artists
World Music Awards winners